Koenigia islandica is a species of annual flowering plant in the buckwheat family, Polygonaceae and is the type species of the genus Koenigia. It is a very small plant and is found growing on wet gravel and scree in arctic tundra and alpine meadows.

Description

Koenigia islandica is a minute, hairless, annual plant with a slender taproot. It has simple or branched, often reddish, stems which root at the lower nodes. The inflorescence is a few-flowered cyme with several bracts. The individual flowers are green, white or pinkish, bisexual, with three tepals, three stamens and three fused carpels. The fruit is a three-sided nut containing a single seed. Flowering occurs during July and August.

Distribution and habitat
Koenigia islandica has a circumboreal arctic/alpine distribution. Its range includes Northern Europe, Central and Northern Asia, North America, Greenland, and Southern Chile and Argentina. In the United States, it is found in Alaska, Colorado, Montana, Utah and Wyoming. In Britain it is restricted to scattered locations on the Isle of Skye and the Isle of Mull.

Ecology
On the island of Svalbard, Koenigia islandica is found on wet alluvial deposits, lake shores, and bare disturbed areas, growing on the black surface formed by mosses, liverworts and algal crust. It is one of only three annual vascular plants present on the island and the only common one, and with its range extending into the northern arctic tundra zone, it is considered the hardiest annual plant in the world. Its success may be due to it being restricted to wet sites, which moderates the climate, making it warmer in cold weather and cooler in hot dry weather. Even when killed by heat or drought after flowering, the plant may wither and dry up, but the fruits can still produce viable seed. Dispersal of the seeds is by birds and water, and they can remain in the ground for years before germinating when the conditions are suitable.

References

Polygonoideae
Plants described in 1767